Joel Heath (born June 18, 1993) is an American football defensive end who is a free agent. He was a three-year starter at Mount Healthy High School in Mount Healthy, Ohio and earned First-team All-State honors twice. He was also named the Associated Press All-Ohio Division II Co-Defensive Player of the Year his senior season in 2010. Heath played college football at Michigan State, where he was a three-year letterman. He was named Honorable Mention All-Big Ten his senior year in 2015. He played in 39 games during his college career, recording 60 tackles, 4.5 sacks, two pass breakups, one forced fumble and one fumble recovery. Heath played for the Houston Texans from 2016 to 2019, and was a member of the Denver Broncos in 2020 and the Detroit Lions in 2021.

Early years
Heath was a three-year starter at Mount Healthy High School in Mount Healthy (in the  Cincinnati, OH metro area, to the north), where he played defensive end and tight end. He recorded 41 tackles and 6.5 sacks during his junior year in 2009. He committed to Michigan State on July 1, 2010. He totaled five sacks throughout his senior season in 2010 and helped Mount Healthy win its first playoff game in school history.

He earned Associated Press (AP) First-team All-Ohio (Division II) honors twice and First-team AP Southwest All-District accolades twice. He was named the AP All-Ohio Division II Co-Defensive Player of the Year, AP Southwest All-District Defensive Player of the Year and Fort Ancient Valley Conference Co-Athlete of the Year for his senior season in 2010. He also earned First-team All-Conference honors twice. He was named to the Cincinnati Enquirer’s All-Area (Division II-VI) Team for his junior season.

He was part of the Ohio All-Stars team that took part in the June 2011 Big 33 Classic in Hershey, Pennsylvania. He was rated the country's 26th best defensive end in the class of 2011 by Scout.com and Ohio's 49th best senior in the class of 2011 by Rivals.com. He was also named to the All-Midwest Team of both SuperPrep and PrepStar.

College career
Heath played for the Michigan State Spartans of Michigan State University from 2012 to 2015 and was a three-year letterman from 2013 to 2015. He was redshirted in 2011.

He began his Michigan State career as a defensive end, playing in five games in 2012 and a further nine in 2013, recording three quarterback hurries and a pass breakup the latter year. He converted to defensive tackle during bowl practices in 2013. He played in 13 games, of which he started all but one, as a defensive tackle in 2014, accumulating 29 tackles and 2.5 sacks while also leading the team's defensive tackles with five tackles for loss. He recorded three tackles, half a sack and a half a tackle for loss in his team's defeat in the January 2015 Cotton Bowl Classic. He started 12 games at defensive tackle in 2015, totaling two sacks and 31 tackles, including 5.5 for tackles for loss. He missed one game due to an undisclosed injury and another game due to an ankle injury. He had three tackles in the December 2015 College Football Playoff Semifinal at the Cotton Bowl. He was named Honorable Mention All-Big Ten by the media in 2015.

Heath played in 39 games, and started 24 of them, during his college career. He recorded career totals of 4.5 sacks, two pass breakups, one forced fumble, one fumble recovery, and 60 tackles, including 10.5 tackles for loss. He graduated from Michigan State in December 2015 with a bachelor's degree in interdisciplinary studies in social science.

Professional career
Heath was rated the 30th best defensive tackle in the 2016 NFL Draft by NFLDraftScout.com. Lance Zierlein of NFL.com said that "Heath has intriguing size that could appeal to defenses running multiple fronts" while also stating that "Heath's lack of pass rush or dominant run stopping tape could hurt his cause on draft weekend."

Houston Texans
Heath signed with the Houston Texans in May 2016 after going undrafted in the 2016 NFL Draft. He chose the Texans over four other teams that he had received contract offers from. He made his NFL debut on September 22 against the New England Patriots, recording one tackle assist. He played in twelve games, of which he started in half of them, and recorded five solo tackles, three tackle assists and 2.0 sacks. Both of his sacks came in the Week 17 game against the Tennessee Titans, making him the sixth rookie in Texans history and the first since Whitney Mercilus in 2012 to record two sacks in a game. He also played in both of the team's playoff games, recording two solo tackles in the first game. He suffered a knee injury during the team's second playoff game.

In May 2017, Heath stated his knee was 100 percent healthy. He suffered a hamstring injury later during the offseason. On July 25, he was placed on the active/non-football injury list. On August 23, he was activated from the active/non-football injury list. He began the 2017 season as the team's starter at right defensive end and has started the team's first four games of the season.

The Texans waived him on August 31, 2019, during final roster cuts. He was re-signed on November 11, 2019. He was released on November 21, but re-signed two days later. He was released on December 28.

Denver Broncos
On December 31, 2019, Heath was claimed off waivers by the Denver Broncos. He was re-signed on March 27, 2020. He was released on July 27, 2020. He chose to opt-out of the 2020 NFL season due to the COVID-19 pandemic and was reinstated to the Broncos' roster on their opt-out reserve list on August 25, 2020. He was waived after the season on February 2, 2021.

Detroit Lions
On February 18, 2021, Heath signed with the Detroit Lions. He was placed on injured reserve on May 28, 2021, due to a torn ACL.

References

External links
College stats

Living people
1993 births
African-American players of American football
People from Mount Healthy, Ohio
Players of American football from Cincinnati
American football defensive tackles
American football defensive ends
Michigan State Spartans football players
Houston Texans players
Denver Broncos players
Detroit Lions players
21st-century African-American sportspeople